Ruines Humaines is the first EP and the very first release of the French band Amesoeurs. It was released in 2006. 
The EP is dedicated to Ian Curtis and Joy Division.

The album was illustrated by former member Fursy Teyssier, who would later re-join the band. Northern Silence Productions released a special digipak edition and also a rerelease on 10" vinyl on March 23, 2007.

Track listing

Personnel

Musicians
 Neige - lead vocals, guitar, bass, synths, drums
 Audrey Sylvain - clean vocals

Technique
 Neige - recording
 Isabelle Hanssen - Photography (front cover)
 Stephane Pousse - Photography (back sleeve)
 Fursy Teyssier - Illustration

References 

Amesoeurs albums